Luis Cesar Condomi (December 19, 1948 – December 23, 2014) was an Argentine football (soccer) midfielder who played for several clubs in El Salvador and Guatemala.

Club career
Condomi played club football in El Salvador for C.D. Juventud Olimpico Metalio, Atletico Marte, C.D. Platense Municipal Zacatecoluca and C.D. Aguila before moving to Guatemala in 1978 to play for Coban Imperial.

External links

1948 births
2014 deaths
Argentine footballers
Argentine expatriate footballers
Expatriate footballers in El Salvador
C.D. Águila footballers
Association football midfielders
Footballers from Buenos Aires